Thomas Burton Loram Kirkwood CBE FMedSci (6 July 1951, Durban, South Africa) is an English biologist who made his contribution to the biology of ageing by proposing the disposable soma theory of aging. He is currently a researcher and Associate Dean for Ageing in Newcastle University and he headed the Institute for Ageing and Health in its school of clinical medical sciences. He is the author of Time of Our Lives: The Science of Human Aging (1999), The End of Age: Why Everything About Aging Is Changing (2001), and co-author of Chance, Development, and Aging (2000, together with Caleb E. Finch).  In 2001 he gave the annual Reith Lectures.

Kirkwood was appointed Commander of the Order of the British Empire (CBE) in the 2009 New Year Honours.

Footnotes

External links
 Biography at the NIHR Newcastle Biomedical Research Centre in Ageing

20th-century British biologists
21st-century British biologists
1951 births
Living people
Commanders of the Order of the British Empire